The 2019 Seoul Open Challenger was a professional tennis tournament played on outdoor hard courts. It was the fifth edition of the tournament. It was part of the 2019 ATP Challenger Tour. It took place in Seoul, South Korea, between 29 April and 5 May 2019.

Singles main draw entrants

Seeds 

 1 Rankings as of 22 April 2019.

Other entrants 
The following players received wildcards into the singles main draw:
  Chung Hong
  Hong Seong-chan
  Kim Dong-ju
  Lee Jea-moon
  Shin San-hui

The following players received entry into the singles main draw using their ITF World Tennis Ranking:
  Bai Yan
  Moez Echargui
  Youssef Hossam
  Shintaro Imai
  Rio Noguchi

The following player received entry into the singles main draw as an alternate:
  Sriram Balaji

The following players received entry from the qualifying draw:
  Jacob Grills
  Nam Ji-sung

The following player received entry as a lucky loser:
  Xia Zihao

Champions

Singles

 Kwon Soon-woo def.  Max Purcell 7–5, 7–5.

Doubles

 Max Purcell /  Luke Saville def.  Ruben Bemelmans /  Sergiy Stakhovsky 6–4, 7–6(9–7).

References

Seoul Open Challenger
2019
2019 in South Korean tennis
April 2019 sports events in South Korea
May 2019 sports events in South Korea